Heather Ludloff (born June 11, 1961) is an American former professional tennis player. 
She attained her highest singles ranking (57th in the world) on August 15, 1983; and her highest doubles ranking (37th in the world) on November 9, 1987. During her career, she garnered two WTA women's doubles titles.

Biography

Career
Ludloff played tennis for Brigham Young University (All American 1981), and  UCLA (All American 1983), eventually becoming one of 9 UCLA grads to reach the top 100 in WTA Tour Singles Rankings.

Teamed with Terry Holladay to win the 1986 Virginia Slims of Newport doubles title. Ludloff has career wins over Elise Burgin and Bettina Bunge. She reached the semifinal of the 1983 NCAA Championship, beating No. 2 seed Elise Burgin before losing to Gigi Fernández.  She was ranked No. 8 in the US National 18s for 1979. Ludloff represented US on Junior Wightman and Federation Cup teams. She was coached by Ken Walts.

WTA Tour finals

Doubles 4 (2–2)

References

External links
 
 

1961 births
Living people
American female tennis players
People from Foster City, California
People from Sonoma County, California
Tennis people from California
UCLA Bruins women's tennis players
BYU Cougars women's tennis players